Mullion is a civil parish and village on the Lizard Peninsula in south Cornwall, England, United Kingdom.

Mullion civil parish encompasses the church town (now known simply as Mullion) and four smaller settlements: Mullion Cove and Predannack to the southwest; Trewoon and Meaver to the east. Mullion is bordered by the parishes of Gunwalloe and Cury to the north, Grade-Ruan to the east, Landewednack to the south, and by Mount's Bay to the west. The parish also includes Mullion Island, a uninhabited island approximately half a mile (0.8 km) offshore from Mullion Cove. The island is home to large colonies of seabirds and is owned by the National Trust.

Etymology
The parish name has evolved over the years, with references in the parish records to St Mullyon, St Mullian, Mullian, Mullyan, Mulion, Mullyon and St Mullion. In the Valor Ecclesiasticus carried out in 1535 the village name is recorded as Melyan. The parish takes its name from Saint Melaine, the Breton Bishop of Rennes who supposedly took office in 519. He was a man of many aliases including the Latin version, Saint Melanius. Reference to early publications and the 1908 Ordnance Survey maps show that the parish church was officially known as St Melan's until at least the start of the 20th century. In the late 19th century, Edmund Harvey (1828-84), Vicar of Mullion, proposed that the parish took its name from 'Mellon' which he believed was an alias of Saint Malo. Saint Malo was a Welshman who moved to Brittany (possibly with his cousin, Saint Samson) where he became Bishop of Aleth (the region now called Saint-Malo) around AD 541. Harvey's ideas have since been discredited. However, an area near one of the ancient chapel sites was known as St Malo's Moor in Harvey's time, and nearby were two fields known as Sampson's Crofts. Harvey was Vicar of Mullion 1865 to 1884; he was an author and musical composer, and interested in church music.

Mullion was surveyed for the Survey of English Dialects.

History

There is evidence for prehistoric burial mounds, Celtic crosses and ancient chapel sites in the parish, and in more recent times evidence of copper and china clay mining, and a World War II airfield at Predannack. Several barrows at Angrowse yielded prehistoric remains when excavated. There is a Cornish cross near the hamlet of Predannack. It has a broad Latin cross on the front and an incised Latin cross on the back.

The existence of a Celtic church here is indicated by the place-names Tremenehee (meaning "sanctuary town") and Lanfrowder (cognate with Lafrowda, the Cornish name of St Just in Penwith) nearby. In Norman times the church of St Melanus lay in the fief of Rosewick; John de Rivers gave it to Mottesfont Priory in 1291 but in 1309 the priory conveyed it to the Dean and Chapter of Exeter. The vicarage was established in 1310 and the chancel of the church was rebuilt before 1331 by the executors of Bishop Bytton of Exeter. Of this chancel part remains but most of the church was built in the 15th century. Robert Luddra (vicar 1512–47) was also provost of Glasney College; he increased the endowment of the vicarage, and contributed funds for the roofs and tower. Features of interest include the fine series of bench ends and other old woodwork.

In the six years up to 1873 there were nine wrecks along a mile-and-a-half stretch of coastline under Mullion cliffs with the loss of sixty-nine lives. The Royal National Lifeboat Institution stationed a lifeboat at Mullion Cove in 1867 but was withdrawn in 1908. The boat house has since been demolished but its barometer is on display in the village.

Like many other Cornish coastal villages there was a pilchard fishery, controlled by seining companies which started in the 18th century out of Mullion Cove. Caught by a seine net, the pilchards were cured at Newlyn and exported to Mediterranean countries. The companies posted a huer (a lookout) on Mullion Island to watch for the dark patch of a nearby shoal of pilchards. There are still a few boats operating a small shellfish industry.

There were a few short-lived copper mines in Mullion parish; first mentioned in a deed of 1741 and the mine(s) had a number of names; Ghost Croft, Goosecroft, Predannack Wartha, South Wheal Unity, Trenance and Wheal Providence. Wheal Unity (or Goosecroft), to the south of Churchtown, opened in 1847, and to the south-east of Pollurian Cove was a mid-19th-century copper mine called Wheal Fenwick. A native copper sheet, found in 1847, and with the dimensions of 9 metres (29'6") x 1.4 metres (4'8") x 15 cm (6") and weighing over 700 kg (14 cwt), from Wheal Unity was exhibited at the 1851 Great Exhibition in London. Compared with the rest of Cornwall copper mining was insignificant and ceased by the end of the 19th century. The mine buildings have disappeared but an adit can still be seen in Mullion Cove.

Talc was quarried in Soapy Cove in the south of the parish during the 18th century. The talc occurs locally as veins in the serpentinite, often known just as 'serpentine' (serpentinite is rich in serpentine minerals). The old quarries form an irregular scar heading from the shore inland. It was used for early porcelain production by Benjamin Lund in Bristol and taken over by the Worcester Porcelain Manufacturers in 1752.

Poldhu is the site of one of the main technological advances of the early twentieth century when in 1901, a wireless signal was sent to St John's, Newfoundland, by Marconi. The technology was a precursor to radio, television, satellites and the internet, with the earth station at Goonhilly Downs a nearby example.

Geography

It is on the Lizard Peninsula, which lies within the Cornwall Area of Outstanding Natural Beauty (AONB). Mullion contains three designated Sites of Special Scientific Interest (SSSIs) – West Lizard SSSI, Baulk Head to Mullion SSSI and Mullion Cliff to Predannack Cliff SSSI, which includes Mullion Island. Mullion Cliff to Predannack Cliff SSSI is noted for its geological and biological interest and contains ten Red Data Book of rare and endangered plant species. Much of the Lizard National Nature Reserve (NNR) is within the parish boundary. The South West Coast Path, which follows the coast of south-west England from Somerset to Dorset passes by on the cliffs along the western edge of the parish.

Mullion Churchtown
The village sits at the end of two river valleys which run southwest from the village, descending steeply to meet the sea at Polurrian Cove and Mullion Cove. North of the village is a third river valley descending west to east and meeting the sea at Poldhu Cove. This river defines the boundary between Mullion and the neighbouring parish of Gunwalloe. The geology of this part of the parish consists mainly of Hornblende Schists, only changing to slate north of Poldhu Cove. The land around the village and on the upper slopes of the river valleys is mostly fertile land cultivated for arable crops and livestock grazing. The small hamlets of Trewoon and Meaver are situated about half a mile to the east of Mullion village. Today Mullion is the largest village on the Lizard Peninsula and is a centre for local services and amenities as well as a popular tourist destination. Mullion School is the local secondary school.

Predannack Downs

In contrast to the northern part of the parish this area remains as semi-natural heath, the growth of which is encouraged by the change in geology south of Mullion Cove to serpentinite. This area is known as Predannack Downs, it is part of the Lizard National Nature Reserve. In the centre of the downs lies the World War II, Predannack Airfield, currently a satellite of nearby RNAS Culdrose.

The southern extent of the parish is marked by a steep, narrow river valley cut into the downs, meeting the sea at Kynance Cove. The coastline along the edge of the downs between Kynance Cove and Mullion Cove consists of high dramatic sheer cliffs with the exception of a deep narrow cleft cut into the Downs at Gew-graze, also known as Soapy Cove. This cove is named after soapstone, a talc-rich type of serpentinite rock found around the cove. Talc was quarried here in the 18th century.

Governance
For the purposes of local government Mullion is a civil parish and every four years elects a parish council consisting of ten councillors. The principal local authority is Cornwall Council and an electoral ward with the same name covers the parish and the surrounding land to Lizard Point. The population of the ward, at the 2011 census, was 4,364.

Sports
Mullion AFC is an association football club playing their home matches at Clifton Parc. The first team play in the Cornwall Combination League, the reserves in the Trelawny League and a women's team in the Cornwall Women's Football League. Mullion Cricket Club play in the fourth tier of the Cornwall Cricket League; Division 3 West.

Mullion Golf Club was founded in 1895 and is the most southerly golf course in the UK.  It is situated in the parish of Gunwalloe.

Notable residents
 Svetlana Alliluyeva, (1926–2011), later known as Lana Peters, was the daughter of Joseph Stalin and spent part of her life in Mullion
 Stephen Halden Beattie VC (1908 – 1975 in Mullion) Captain Beattie was awarded his VC being the captain of HMS Campbeltown which was used to ram and destroy the dock gates in Saint-Nazaire to prevent its use by the German battleship, Tirpitz
 James Erisey was born at Erisey House near Mullion approx 1560. He sailed as a privateer with Sir Francis Drake
 Andrew Henry George (born 1958 in Mullion) is a British Liberal Democrat politician. He was MP for St Ives from 1997 to 2015
 Ernest Herbert Pitcher, VC, (1888 in Mullion – 1946) petty officer in the Royal Navy
 Sheila Tracy (née Lugg; 1934 in Mullion – 2014) was a British broadcaster, writer, musician, and singer. She began her career as a trombone player during the 1950s in all-female bands.
 Squadron Leader Geoffrey Wellum DFC (1921–2018), British Battle of Britain fighter pilot and author who retired to Mullion in the mid 1980s

References

External links

 Mullion OCS
 Cornwall Record Office Online Catalogue for Mullion
 

 
Villages in Cornwall
Civil parishes in Cornwall
Sites of Special Scientific Interest in Cornwall
Lizard Peninsula